Beilschmiedia lucidula is a widespread species of flowering plant in the family Lauraceae, native to the eastern Indian Subcontinent, Indochina, and most of Malesia. A tree reaching , it is often found growing on poor soils in seasonally wet areas.

References

lucidula
Flora of Nepal
Flora of East Himalaya
Flora of Assam (region)
Flora of Bangladesh
Flora of Indo-China
Flora of Malesia
Plants described in 1970